Nicholas IV served as Greek Patriarch of Alexandria between 1412 and 1417.

References

15th-century Patriarchs of Alexandria